Nathan Ephraums (born 9 June 1999) is a field hockey player from Australia, who plays as a forward.

Personal life
Nathan Ephraums was born and raised in Keysborough, Victoria.

He is a current scholarship holder with the Victorian Institute of Sport (VIS).

Nathan's older brother Joshua, is also a semi-professional hockey player.

Career

Domestic leagues

Australian Hockey League
In 2018, Ephraums made his debut for the VIC Vikings in the Australian Hockey League.

Hockey One
Following Hockey Australia's overhaul of the AHL and subsequent introduction of the Sultana Bran Hockey One League in 2019, Ephraums was named in the HC Melbourne squad for the inaugural season. The team finished in fourth place, losing in the semi-finals to eventual winners, the NSW Pride.

National teams

Under–21
Nathan Ephruams made his debut for the Australia Under–21 side in 2017, at the Sultan of Johor Cup. At the tournament, the team won a gold medal.

He followed this up with two appearances in 2018, again at the Sultan of Johor Cup, winning a bronze medal, and at an eight nations tournament in Spain in 2019.

Kookaburras
In November 2019, Ephraums was named in the Kookaburras team for the first time, following one year in the National Development Squad.

References

External links
 
 
 

1999 births
Living people
Australian male field hockey players
Male field hockey forwards
Field hockey players at the 2022 Commonwealth Games
Commonwealth Games gold medallists for Australia
Commonwealth Games medallists in field hockey
20th-century Australian people
21st-century Australian people
People from the City of Greater Dandenong
Field hockey players from Melbourne
Sportsmen from Victoria (Australia)
2023 Men's FIH Hockey World Cup players
Medallists at the 2022 Commonwealth Games